Zin Mar Oo (1969/70 – 11 March 2021) was a Burmese actress who won the Myanmar Academy Award in the 1993 film .

Career
In the 1993 film Thida Khonnatan, Zin Mar Oo took on the leading role and won the Myanmar Academy Award for the Best Actress.

She also starred in some well-known films which made her rise in popularity such as Doe (1989), Kyi Soe Tun's Sone Yay (1990), Taikpwe Khawthan (1995) and Ngayetha (2000).

Personal life and death
Her husband, Thiha Tin Soe, is also an actor. The couple have a son and a daughter.

Zin Mar Oo had suffered from lung disease for two years and died of chronic illness on 11 March 2021.

Awards and nominations

References

External links
 

1970s births
2021 deaths
Burmese film actresses
People from Yangon
20th-century Burmese actresses